Damman is a surname. Notable people with the surname include:

Carlo Damman (born 1993), Belgian footballer
James Damman (1933–2011), American politician
Jean Damman (born 1949), Belgian equestrian
Percy Damman (1876–1970), Australian rules footballer

See also
Damian (surname)